Natasja Nobels (born 24 September 1980) is a former Belgian racing cyclist. She finished in third place in the Belgian National Road Race Championships in 2005.

References

External links

1980 births
Living people
Belgian female cyclists
People from Dendermonde
Cyclists from East Flanders